Australian Families of Crime is an Australian documentary television series that was originally aired on Pay TV Foxtel and hosted by Steve Leibmann.  The same episodes were then shown on the Free to air  Nine Network but hosted by actor Vince Colosimo to capitalise on the Underbelly crime series at the time, also airing on the Nine Network of which Vince Colosimo also starred in.  Families of Crime gives an insight into some of Australia's most infamous 'Crime Families' who wielded power, fear and destruction through the community.

Through interviews with family members, associates, victims and police investigators, their stories expose how some of Australia's worst criminal families operated their web of violence and corruption.

Episodes
Season 1
Episode 1 – Carl Williams: Baby Faced Killer
Episode 2 – Ivan Milat: Backpacker Bloodshed
Episode 3 – Abe Saffron: King of the Cross
Episode 4 – Mother of Evil: Pettingill
Episode 5 – Dockers & Death: Les and Brian Kane
Episode 6 – Mr. Bigs: Lenny McPherson and George Freeman
Episode 7 – The Killer Couple: David and Catherine Birnie
Episode 8 – Blood Brothers: The Anita Cobby Killers

References

External links

2010s Australian documentary television series
Nine Network original programming
2010 Australian television series debuts
2010 Australian television series endings